State Road 126 in the U.S. State of Indiana was a short east–west highway connecting former State Road 526 (McCormick Road) with the former alignment of U.S. Route 231 (Northwestern Avenue) in West Lafayette.

Route description

State Road 126 formed the northern boundary of the Purdue University campus. It was a child of, and ran parallel to, State Road 26 which was about a mile to the south.  It was concurrent with Cherry Lane and passed just to the north of Ross–Ade Stadium before terminating at Northwestern Avenue.  It was decommissioned on 9/13/13.

Major intersections

References

External links

126
Transportation in Tippecanoe County, Indiana